is a 1957 color Japanese film drama directed by Hiromasa Nomura. The film is about Yoshiko Kawashima. Its English title is "Queen of Asia".

Cast 
 Ureo Egawa
 Kazuo Kodama
 Shōji Nakayama
 Tomohiko Ohtani
 Takihiro Oka
 Hirotaro Sugiyama
 Miyuki Takakura
 Tadao Takashima
 Tetsurō Tamba
 Ken Utsui

References

External links 
 

Japanese historical drama films
1957 films
Shintoho films
1950s Japanese films